The Clifford W. Holmes Award is presented annually near Big Bear City, California at the RTMC Astronomy Expo to an individual for a significant contribution to popularizing astronomy. 

Established in 1978 by Richard Poremba as the Astronomy for America Award, it was renamed for Clifford W. Holmes, the founder of the Riverside Telescope Makers Conference (RTMC) in 1980.

Awardees 

Recipients of the award are: 

 1978: Paul Zurakowski
 1979: Arthur Leonard
 1980: Robert E. Cox
 1981: Richard Berry
 1982: Dennis di Cicco
 1983: John Dobson
 1984: Jim Jacobson
 1985: Arthur Leonard
 1986: Bob Schalck
 1987: Clyde Tombaugh
 1988: Kevin Medlock
 1989: David H. Levy
 1990: Dick Buchroeder,
 1991: Rick Shaffer
 1992: Ashley McDermott
 1993: John Sanford
 1994: Donald C. Parker
 1995: Don Machholz
 1996: Gil Clark
 1997: Randall Wilcox
 1998: Randy Johnson
 1999: William Seavey
 2000: Tom Cave
 2001: Scott W. Roberts
 2002: Ed Krupp
 2003: Steve Edberg
 2004: Dean Ketelsen
 2005: Mike Simmons
 2006: Al Fink
 2007: Dave Rodrigues
 2008: Laura and Bob Eklund
 2009: Don Nicholson
 2010: David Crawford
 2011: Robert Victor
 2012: Robert D. Stephens
 2013: Jim Benet
 2014: Jane Houston-Jones
 2015: Terri Lappin
 2016: Randy and Pamela Shivak

See also

 List of astronomy awards

References

External links 
 RTMC Astronomy Expo

Astronomy prizes